Ignacio 'Nacho' Neira Pedraja (born 16 November 1986) is a Spanish footballer who plays for Club Portugalete as a central defender.

Club career
Born in Santoña, Cantabria, Neira graduated from local CD Laredo's youth system, but made his senior debuts with Santoña CF in the 2005–06 season, in the Tercera División. He first arrived in the Segunda División B in 2008 with Racing de Santander B, after a brief stint at Gimnástica de Torrelavega.

In July 2009 Neira returned to Gimnástica, now in the third tier. On 31 January 2013, after featuring regularly for the club over the course of three-and-a-half seasons, he moved abroad for the first time in his career, joining Greek Football League side Kalloni F.C.

Neira played his first match as a professional on 22 May 2013, starting in a 3–0 away win against Anagennisi Giannitsa F.C., in which was his maiden appearance in the competition. On 21 June he returned to his home country, signing for third-tier Barakaldo CF; he subsequently resumed his career in the same division, representing FC Cartagena and Sestao River.

References

External links

1986 births
Living people
People from Santoña
Spanish footballers
Footballers from Cantabria
Association football defenders
Segunda División B players
Tercera División players
Gimnástica de Torrelavega footballers
Rayo Cantabria players
Barakaldo CF footballers
FC Cartagena footballers
Sestao River footballers
Football League (Greece) players
Spanish expatriate footballers
Spanish expatriate sportspeople in Greece
Expatriate footballers in Greece